The All-Ireland Intermediate Camogie Championship is a competition in the women's field sport of camogie for second-tier county teams and for second-string teams of first-tier counties. If the winning team comes from a second-tier county, that county is promoted to the following year's senior championship. Similarly, the winner of the All-Ireland junior championship is promoted to the following year's Intermediate Championship.  The grade mirrors Division 2 of the National Camogie League. The final is played in Croke Park Dublin alongside the Senior and Junior finals. The 2021 competition was contested by Antrim, Carlow, Derry, Laois, Kerry, Kildare, Meath and the second teams of Cork, Dublin, Galway, Kilkenny and Tipperary.

History
The competition was inaugurated in 1992 with Corn Uí Phuirséil being presented to the winners. It was discontinued in 2005 and replaced by the All Ireland Senior B Championship in 2006 and 2007 before being revived in 2008. The Jack McGrath cup is currently presented to the winners.

Jack McGrath Cup Camogie Finals
The first numeral in the scoreline of each team is the number of goals scored (equal to 3 points each) and the second numeral is the number of points scored, the figures are combined to determine the winner of a match in Gaelic games.

No competition in 2005, Played as All Ireland Senior B Championship 2006–7.

Roll of Honour

Wins Listed By County

Wins Listed By Province

See also
 All-Ireland Senior Camogie Championship
 All-Ireland Junior Camogie Championship
 Wikipedia List of Camogie players
 National Camogie League
 Camogie All Stars Awards
 Ashbourne Cup

References

External links
 An Cumann Camógaíochta
 Camogie on GAA Oral History Project

2